The 2017–18 Delaware State Hornets men's basketball team represented Delaware State University during the 2017–18 NCAA Division I men's basketball season. The Hornets, led by fourth-year head coach Keith Walker, played their home games at Memorial Hall in Dover, Delaware as members of the Mid-Eastern Athletic Conference.

The Hornets finished 4–28, 2–14 in the MEAC play to finish in last place. They lost in the first round of the MEAC tournament to North Carolina A&T. They lost every game on the road and on a neutral court, with both of their non-conference victories coming against non-Division I schools. They had the dubious distinction of finishing the season 351st in RPI out of the 351 teams in the NCAA.

On February 22, 2018, head coach Keith Walker was fired and associate head coach Keith Johnson was named interim head coach for the remainder of the season. On July 26, 5 months after Walker was fired, the school hired UMBC assistant Eric Skeeters for the head coaching job.

Previous season
The Hornets finished the 2016–17 season 10–22, 7–9 in MEAC play to finish in a three-way tie for seventh place. They lost in the first round of the MEAC tournament to Bethune–Cookman.

Roster

Schedule and results

|-
!colspan=9 style=| Non-conference regular season

|-
!colspan=9 style=| MEAC regular season

|-
!colspan=9 style=| MEAC tournament

References

Delaware State Hornets men's basketball seasons
Delaware State
Horn
Horn